Dolné Zahorany (earlier: Maďarské Záhorany) is a village and municipality in the Rimavská Sobota District of the Banská Bystrica Region of Slovakia.

History
In historical records, the village was first mentioned in 1341 (1341 Hegmuky, Hegmeg, 1427 Hegymeg). Originally, it was situated between Padarovce and Lukovištie. In 1566 it was completely destroyed by the Turks and later rebuilt at the current location.

Genealogical resources

The records for genealogical research are available at the state archive "Statny Archiv in Banska Bystrica, Slovakia"

 Roman Catholic church records (births/marriages/deaths): 1774-1873 (parish B)
 Lutheran church records (births/marriages/deaths): 1767-1883 (parish B)

See also
 List of municipalities and towns in Slovakia

External links
https://web.archive.org/web/20071116010355/http://www.statistics.sk/mosmis/eng/run.html
http://www.e-obce.sk/obec/dolnezahorany/dolne-zahorany.html
Surnames of living people in Dolne Zahorany

Villages and municipalities in Rimavská Sobota District